is a mountain located in the Kabato Mountains on the border of Tōbetsu and Shintotsukawa, Hokkaidō, Japan. Mount Machine derives its name from the Ainu language matne-sir, meaning "female land". The name of neighboring Pinneshiri means '"male land".

References

Machine